Zapolye is a rural locality (a village) in Vereshchaginsky District, Perm Krai, Russia. The population was 87 as of 2010.

Geography 
Zapolye is located 20 km west of Vereshchagino (the district's administrative centre) by road. Posad is the nearest rural locality.

References 

Rural localities in Vereshchaginsky District